Walrencea is a monotypic genus of South African nursery web spiders containing the single species, Walrencea globosa. It was first described by P. Blandin in 1979, and is only found in South Africa.

See also
 List of Pisauridae species

References

Endemic fauna of South Africa
Monotypic Araneomorphae genera
Pisauridae
Spiders of South Africa